Severity is a cancelled first-person shooter video game that was being developed by Escalation Studios for Microsoft Windows, PlayStation 3, and Xbox 360. Funded by the Cyberathlete Professional League (CPL), the game was set to include a blend of different first-person shooter gameplay styles, separating them as individual game modes, as well as cross-platform multiplayer.

Severity was announced by game developer John Romero at the 2006 CPL Championship Finals. Despite the CPL announcing that it would be ceasing tournament operations on March 13, 2008, and then being acquired by an investment group based in the United Arab Emirates on August 25, 2008, Escalation Studios managing director Tom Mustaine confirmed on that the game was still in development, however, it was not the primary focus of the studio at the given time. In an interview from October 28, 2009, CPL founder Angel Munoz confirmed that production on Severity had ended, stating that they had not found a publisher and thus additional funds for the game.

References 

Cancelled PlayStation 3 games
Cancelled Windows games
Cancelled Xbox 360 games
First-person shooters